The following list includes notable people who were born or have lived in Cairo, Illinois. For a similar list organized alphabetically by last name, see the category page People from Cairo, Illinois.

Academics

Business

Media

Military

Music

Politics

Religion

Sports

References

Cairo
Cairo